AMCON Distributing Company is one of the largest wholesale distributors in the United States serving approximately 4,000 retail outlets including convenience stores, grocery stores, liquor stores, drug stores, and tobacco shops. AMCON currently distributes over 17,000 different consumer products, including cigarettes and tobacco products, candy and other confectionery, beverages, groceries, paper products, health and beauty care products, frozen and chilled products and institutional foodservice products. Convenience stores represent the largest customer category. In November 2018, Convenience Store News ranked AMCON as the eighth (8th) largest convenience store distributor in the United States based on annual sales.

Background 
AMCON Distributing Company was established in 1986 in Omaha, Nebraska. Annual sales were $1,322,306,658 for the fiscal year ending on September 30, 2018. AMCON has corporate headquarters in Omaha, NE and operates six wholesale distribution centers located in Omaha, NE, Quincy, IL, Rapid City, SD, Bismarck, ND, Springfield, MO and Crossville, TN.

References 

Companies listed on NYSE American
American companies established in 1986
Companies based in Omaha, Nebraska
Business services companies established in 1986
1986 establishments in Nebraska
Wholesalers of the United States